Fletcher is a rural locality in the Southern Downs Region, Queensland, Australia.

Geography 
The Severn River forms the western boundary of the locality. The terrain is somewhat mountainous with the land in the valleys between being used for farming. A small area in the east of the locality is part of the Girraween National Park. Apart from that the predominant land use is grazing on native vegetation and crop growing.

The New England Highway and South Western railway line pass from north (Glen Aplin) to south (Ballandean) through the locality.

History 

In 1872 Thomas Henry Fletcher established the Britannia Hotel in present-day Ballandean. He planted a small orchard beside his hotel. While he was successful at fruit growing, most of the interest in the district was in mining. 

The locality of Fletcher is presume to be named after the Fletcher railway station, which was named by the Queensland Railways Department in 1887, after orchardist Thomas Henry Fletcher, who pioneered the growing of fruit in the Granite Belt area.

Education 
There are no schools in the locality. The nearest primary schools are Glen Aplin State School in neighbouring Glen Aplin to the north and Ballandean State School in neighbouring Ballandean to the south. The nearest secondary school is Stanthorpe State High School in Stanthorpe to the north-west.

References 

Southern Downs Region
Localities in Queensland